Daniel Waszkiewicz (born 7 January 1957, in Chocianów) is a former Polish team handball player. He played more than 200 matches for the Poland men's national handball team during his career. He participated at the 1980 Summer Olympics, where Poland finished 7th.

References

External links

1957 births
Living people
Polish male handball players
Polish handball coaches
Handball coaches of international teams
Olympic handball players of Poland
Handball players at the 1980 Summer Olympics
People from Polkowice County
Sportspeople from Lower Silesian Voivodeship